Khutse Game Reserve is a game reserve in Botswana.

Overview
The name Khutse means "where one kneels to drink" in Sekwena (the local dialect of Tswana). Because of its proximity, and relative accessibility, to the nation's capital, Khutse game Reserve is a favorite retreat for Gaborone visitors or residents. The 240 km drive takes the traveller through a number of interesting Kalahari villages, including the ‘gateway to the Kalahari,’ Molepolole.

Geography
Adjoining the Central Kalahari Game Reserve to the north, and with no fences separating the two, the terrain of the 2 500 km2 reserve combines most types of Kalahari habitat – rolling grasslands, river beds, fossil dunes and grassed and bare pans.

There is a series of rather picturesque pans where wildlife often congregate, particularly during and following good rains; and indeed game drives are focused around the pans. These include the Motailane, Moreswa and Molose pans. Sometimes water is pumped at artificial waterholes at Moreswa and Molose, making for good game viewing year round.

Flora and fauna
Animals commonly sighted include springbok (often in abundance), gemsbok (often common), South African giraffe, wildebeest, hartebeest, kudu, black-backed jackal, steenbok, duiker, and the accompanying predators lion, African leopard, South African cheetah, wildcat, and the endangered brown hyena.

References

National parks of Botswana